In Great Britain, there are inter-city trains to numerous parts of the country.  Most of these trains are high speed, and some operate into France, Belgium and the Netherlands.

Before the sectorisation of British Rail, inter-city trains were operated by InterCity.  InterCity ran trains from London to South West England, Wales, the West Midlands, the East Midlands, North West England, Yorkshire and the Humber, North East England, Scotland and East of England.  There were also numerous cross-country services, which were inter-city services that traversed several regions and usually avoided Greater London.

The UK's longest direct rail service is operated by CrossCountry from Aberdeen to Penzance, and takes 13 hours 23 minutes to complete.

Inter-city trains from London operate out of the following London terminals:
London Euston — trains to Wales, North West England, the West Midlands and Scotland;
London King's Cross — trains to the East Midlands, Yorkshire and the Humber, North East England and Scotland;
London Paddington — trains to South West England, Wales and the West Midlands;
London St Pancras International — trains to the East Midlands, Yorkshire and the Humber, France, Belgium and the Netherlands;
London Liverpool Street — trains to East of England.
London Waterloo — Trains to South East and West of England.

The following train operating companies operate inter-city trains in Great Britain (operators marked with an asterisk are open-access operators):
Avanti West Coast
Caledonian Sleeper
CrossCountry
East Midlands Railway (EMR)
Eurostar*
Great Western Railway (GWR)
Greater Anglia
Grand Central*
Hull Trains*
London North Eastern Railway (LNER)
Lumo*
ScotRail
South Western Railway
TransPennine Express
Transport for Wales (TfW)

See also
Rail transport in the United Kingdom
High-speed rail in the United Kingdom

References

Passenger rail transport in the United Kingdom